Humphrey Sibthorp (3 October 1744 – 25 April 1815)  was a British Tory politician who sat in the House of Commons in two periods between 1777 and 1806.

Sibthorp was the eldest surviving son of the botanist Humphry Sibthorp and his first wife Sarah Waldo, daughter of Isaac Waldo of Streatham, Surrey. He was educated at Harrow School in 1755 and Westminster School in 1756. In 1758 he matriculated at Corpus Christi College, Oxford on 24 May and was awarded BA in 1762 and MA in 1766. He entered Lincoln's Inn in 1766 and was called to the bar in 1770.
 
At the 1774 general election, Sibthorp stood for Parliament at Lincoln  and Newark, and was bottom of the poll in both constituencies. He was elected as a Member of Parliament (MP) for Boston at a by-election on 3 May 1777, after the death of Charles Amcotts MP.  He was re-elected in 1780, but was defeated at the 1784 general election.

Sibthorp  was elected as a Member of Parliament (MP) for Lincoln at a by-election on 9  April 1800, after the death of George Rawdon MP.   He was re-elected in 1802, but declined to stand 1806 general election, because of ill-health.

Sibthorp's sons include Charles Sibthorp, an MP notorious for his Ultra-Tory views, and Richard Sibthorp, an Anglican priest who gained notoriety for his conversion to Roman Catholicism.

Family

References

External links 
 

1744 births
1815 deaths
People educated at Harrow School
People educated at Westminster School, London
Alumni of Corpus Christi College, Oxford
Members of Lincoln's Inn
Members of the Parliament of Great Britain for English constituencies
British MPs 1774–1780
British MPs 1780–1784
British MPs 1796–1800
Members of the Parliament of the United Kingdom for English constituencies
UK MPs 1801–1802
UK MPs 1802–1806
Politics of Lincoln, England
Tory MPs (pre-1834)